Vistilia was an ancient Roman prostitute prosecuted for immorality during the reign of Tiberius.

Biography
She was of the gens Vistilia and probably the daughter of Sextus Vistilius, making her a cousin of the future empress Milonia Caesonia, through Caesonia's mother Vistilia.

Tacitus mentions Vistilia as a public prostitute who advertised her services to the aediles of Rome. In 19 AD, the Roman Senate passed a law that no Roman woman whose father or grandfather was of equestrian status or higher could register as a prostitute.

Vistilia was accordingly tried by the Roman Senate for immorality. Her husband, Titidius Labeo, asked why he had not tried to enforce the statutory penalty, stated the consultation period (which was sixty days) had not yet expired. The senate decided to prosecute only Vistilia (under Roman law, husbands who did not immediately punish adulterous wives could be tried as pimps). Vistilia was found guilty of prostitution and she was deported to the Greek island of Seriphos.

See also
 List of Roman women
 Women in ancient Rome

References

Prostitution in ancient Rome
Female prostitutes
People convicted of sex crimes
1st-century Roman women
Vistilii